Fe'fe' or Fe'efe'e, also known as Nufi or Bafang, is a Bamileke language spoken in Cameroon, around the town of Bafang. It was one of the four languages selected for option at the Collège Libermann at Douala (along with Duala, Basaa and Banjun).

Writing system

Phonology

Consonants

Vowels

Tone 
The language has a complex tone system, carefully described, along with other aspects of the phonology and morphology, in Hyman (1972).

References

External links

Language Museum
List of Nufi terms and their German translation
Résurrection des langues minoritaires
Alphabet camerounais

Languages of Cameroon
Bamileke languages